Andrej Borisovich Arbuzov (born 30 June 1967 in Protvino, USSR) is a Russian theoretical physicist. His scientific interests include quantum field theory, elementary particle physics, and cosmology. He is affiliated with the Joint Institute for Nuclear Research as a group leader in the Bogoliubov Laboratory of Theoretical Physics. He is a Doctor of Sciences in physical-mathematical sciences (2011), professor of the Russian Academy of Sciences (2016).

Biography 
Andrej Arbuzov was born in Protvino, Moscow region on 30 June 1967. His father is Boris Arbuzov.

Education 
 Graduated from the Lomonosov Moscow State University, the Faculty of Physics (1992).

Scientific and academic degrees 
 Candidate of sciences degree in physical-mathematical sciences with the theoretical physics specialty was received from the Joint Institute for Nuclear Research (1996) under the guidance of professor Eduard Kuraev. 
 Doctor of Sciences degree in physical-mathematical sciences with the theoretical physics specialty was defended at the Institute for Nuclear Research (INR RAS) (2011). 
 Academic rank: professor of the Russian Academy of Sciences (2016).

Career 
 1992—1998 work in the Bogoliubov Laboratory of Theoretical Physics, Joint Institute for Nuclear Research, Dubna, Russia.
 1999—2000 postdoctoral researcher at the University of Turin, Turin, Italy.
 2001—2002 postdoctoral researcher at the University of Alberta, Edmonton, Canada.
 Since 2002 work in the Bogoliubov Laboratory of Theoretical Physics, Joint Institute for Nuclear Research, Dubna, Russia.
 2012—2017 worked as a Deputy director of the Bogoliubov Laboratory of Theoretical Physics, Joint Institute for Nuclear Research.
 Professor at the Dubna State University. 
 Secretary of the "Physics of Elementary Particles and Atomic Nuclei" journal editorial board.
 Member of the "MDPI Universe journal" advisory board.

Scientific achievements 
Scientific interests of A. B. Arbuzov include quantum field theory, phenomenology of the Standard Model of particle physics, radiative corrections, and Cosmology. He contributed to the development of theoretical methods for high-precision description of particle interactions. His results were used in the data analysis of many experiments at colliders including HERA, VEPP-2000, LEP, and LHC.

Scientific publications 
 In the inSPIRE database 
 In the Scopus database
 In the Google Scholar database

References

External links 
 Personal page on the Joint Institute for Nuclear Research site
 Personal profile in the inSPIRE database
 Personal profile in the Scopus database
 Personal profile in ORCID
 Personal page on the All-Russian Mathematical Portal "Math-Net.ru" (in Russian)
 Profile in database Russian Science Citation Index (in Russian)

1967 births
Theoretical physicists
20th-century Russian physicists
21st-century Russian physicists
Moscow State University alumni
Living people
Russian professors
Scientists from Moscow